Apocreadiidae  is a family of parasitic worms in the class Trematoda.

Characteristics
Members of the family are characterised by having extensive vitelline (yolk producing) follicles, eye-spot pigment dispersed in the front half of the body, a rod-shaped excretory vesicle, no cirrus-sac and the genital pore just in front of the ventral sucker or occasionally just behind it.

Genera
The World Register of Marine Species lists the following genera:
Apocreadiinae Skrjabin, 1942
Callohelmis Cribb & Bray, 1999
Choanodera Manter, 1940
Crassicutis Manter, 1936
Dactylotrema Bravo-Hollis & Manter, 1957
Homalometron Stafford, 1904
Marsupioacetabulum Yamaguti, 1952
Microcreadium Simer, 1929
Myzotus Manter, 1940
Neoapocreadium Siddiqi & Cable, 1960
Neomegasolena Siddiqi & Cable, 1960
Pancreadium Manter, 1954
Posterotestis Ostrowski de Nunez, Brugni & Flores, 2003
Procaudotestis Szidat, 1954
Trematobrien Dollfus, 1950
Megaperinae Manter, 1934
Haintestinum Pulis, Curran, Andres & Overstreet, 2013
Megapera Manter, 1934
Thysanopharynx Manter, 1933
Postporinae Yamaguti, 1958
Postporus Manter, 1949
Schistorchiinae Yamaguti, 1942
Megacreadium Nagaty, 1956
Neomegacreadium Machida & Kuramochi, 1999
Schistorchis Lühe in Herdman, 1906
Sphincteristomum Oshmarin, Mamaev & Parukhin, 1961
Sphincterostoma Yamaguti, 1937

References

Plagiorchiida
Trematode families